Mäntyvaara is a village and hill in the Swedish municipality of Gällivare. The village lies on the south slope of the hill.

References

Populated places in Norrbotten County